The Central District of Heris County is in East Azerbaijan province, Iran. At the National Census in 2006, its population was 37,475 in 8,915 households. The following census in 2011 counted 39,735 people in 10,657 households. At the latest census in 2016, the district had 40,558 inhabitants in 12,109 households.

References 

Heris County

Districts of East Azerbaijan Province

Populated places in East Azerbaijan Province

Populated places in Heris County